John Rankin (1 February 1889 – 8 October 1973) was a Scottish Labour Co-operative politician.

Rankin was educated at Allan Glen's School (Glasgow), and the University of Glasgow. He became a school teacher, propagandist and lecturer. He took a significant part in the debates on the Education (Scotland) Bill in 1969 that, once passed and enacted. led to the change in status of Allan Glen's School and other state selective schools in Scotland to comprehensives.

Career
Rankin first stood for Parliament without success in Glasgow Pollok in 1923, 1924 and 1935. He served as Labour Co-operative Member of Parliament (MP) for the constituency of Glasgow Tradeston from 1945 to 1955 and for Glasgow Govan from 1955 until his death in 1973 aged 84. His death led to the 1973 Glasgow Govan by-election, famously won by Margo MacDonald for the Scottish National Party.

References

Sources

External links
 

1889 births
1973 deaths
20th-century Scottish writers
Alumni of the University of Glasgow
Labour Co-operative MPs for Scottish constituencies
Members of the Parliament of the United Kingdom for Glasgow constituencies
People educated at Allan Glen's School
Politicians from Glasgow
Scottish schoolteachers
UK MPs 1945–1950
UK MPs 1950–1951
UK MPs 1951–1955
UK MPs 1955–1959
UK MPs 1959–1964
UK MPs 1964–1966
UK MPs 1966–1970
UK MPs 1970–1974